Kebab Connection is a 2004 German-Turkish comedy film with some slapstick that is set in Hamburg and directed by Anno Saul.

Plot
Ibo (Denis Moschitto) is a young Turkish-German man who is an aspiring filmmaker. A clash of cultures and pre-parental anxiety ensues after Ibo's German girlfriend, Titzi (Nora Tschirner), announces that she's pregnant. Ibo's father (Güven Kıraç) is upset at his son for wanting to start a family with a non-Turkish German woman while Titzi is upset at Ibo over his hesitance in taking on fatherly responsibilities. Other themes are the competition of a Turkish kebab restaurant and a Greek taverna, a gang trying to extort the owner of the kebab restaurant, Ibo's quest to make the first German Kung-Fu movie and the pursuit of both Titzi and her roommate at a prestigious drama academy.

Cast
 Denis Moschitto - Ibo
 Nora Tschirner - Titzi
 Güven Kıraç - Ibo's father
 Hasan Ali Mete - Onkel Ahmet
 Adnan Maral - Kirianis
 Fahri Yardım - Lefty
 Adam Bousdoukos - Valid
 Cem Akın - Altan
 Nursel Köse - Hatice
 Tatjana Velimirov - Stella
 Romina Fütterer - Ayla
 Kida Khodr Ramadan - Özgür

See also
 Yasemin
 Terrorism and Kebab

External links

2004 films
2004 comedy films
German comedy films
Turkish comedy films
Films set in Hamburg
Films shot in Hamburg
Interfaith romance films
2000s German films